Clean Head is Oceana's first EP, and a follow-up to their second release Birth.Eater. The album was written with the intent of being the B-sides to Birth.Eater and covers similar topics. The record focuses primarily around the idea of finding beauty in life through whatever way you see fit. This album shows a vast sound change and maturity of the band as a whole and was very well received by fans and critics. Clean Head will be released as a Hot Topic exclusive, and on various online distribution services. This new EP has a total of four songs. The album was released on May 11, 2010. "Birth.Eater" will also be re-released by Distort Entertainment, with the four new EP tracks. This is also the last release to feature guitarist Jack Burns as well as the last under the "Oceana" name.

Reception 

Clean Head has been incredibly well received by reviewers and fans alike. Rinse, Review, Repeat put the EP in high regards saying "For only being four songs long, the Clean Head EP stands as its own pillar in Oceana’s ever-changing progression as a band, filling the intimate gap needed to complete the array of soundscapes they’ve released in the past."

Track listing

Personnel 
 Brennan Taulbee - lead vocals, keys, guitar
 Alex Schultz - guitar, vocals
 Jack Burns - guitar
 Kolby Crider - bass
 Denny Agosto - drums

References

External links 
 Oceana at Myspace
 Oceana recording at Glow In the Dark Studios.

Oceana (band) albums
2010 EPs
Rise Records EPs